Foothills-Rocky View was a provincial electoral district in Alberta, Canada, mandated to return a single member to the Legislative Assembly of Alberta from under the First Past the Post voting system 2004 to 2012.

History
The Foothills-Rocky View electoral district was located on the western rural edge of Calgary in southern Alberta. It was created in the 2003 electoral boundary re-distribution from the eastern portion of the electoral district of Banff-Cochrane and the western portion of the old electoral district of Airdrie-Rocky View which comprises the northern portion of the riding. The district is named after the Foothills of Southern Alberta and Rocky View County. The riding included part of the town of Cochrane, Bragg Creek and the Springbank area.

The Foothills-Rocky View electoral district was dissolved in the 2017 electoral boundary re-distribution, and portions of the district would incorporate the Airdrie, Banff-Cochrane and Chestermere-Rocky View electoral districts for the 2019 Alberta general election.

The district and its antecedents have been favorable to electing Progressive Conservative candidates in recent decades.

Boundary history

Electoral history
The electoral district was created in the 2004 boundary redistribution. In the election held that year Progressive Conservative candidate Ted Morton who chose not to run for another term of senator-in-waiting in the 2004 Senate nominee election decided to run for seat to the legislature instead.

Morton defeated four other candidates with 60% of the vote to pick up the new district for the Progressive Conservatives. After the election Morton began his race to succeed Ralph Klein in the 2006 Progressive Conservative leadership race. Morton lost but was appointed to cabinet by new Premier Ed Stelmach in 2006.

Morton ran for a second term in the 2008 general election. He slightly increased his popular vote and returned to power with a big majority. In 2010 he was shuffled to the Minister of Finance portfolio.

Election results

2004 general election

2008 general election

Senate election results

2004 Senate nominee election district results

Voters had the option of selecting 4 Candidates on the Ballot

2004 Student Vote

On November 19, 2004 a Student Vote was conducted at participating Alberta schools to parallel the 2004 Alberta general election results. The vote was designed to educate students and simulate the electoral process for persons who have not yet reached the legal majority. The vote was conducted in 80 of the 83 provincial electoral districts with students voting for actual election candidates. Schools with a large student body that reside in another electoral district had the option to vote for candidates outside of the electoral district then where they were physically located.

See also
List of Alberta provincial electoral districts

References

Further reading

External links
Elections Alberta
The Legislative Assembly of Alberta
Information Package: Foothills-Rocky View Electoral District - Legislature Library 2004

Former provincial electoral districts of Alberta